La Democracia, founded on 1 July 1890, was a news daily published by Luis Muñoz Rivera in Ponce, Puerto Rico. It crusaded for Puerto Rican self-government. At a publication length of 58 years, it was the longest continuously-running Puerto Rican Spanish newspaper of its time, and one of the longest continuously running Puerto Rican newspapers of all time.

History
La Democracia was for many years the official organ of the Liberal Party. It began in Ponce in 1890, as a newspaper with three issues per week, but in May, 1893, it became a daily.  After ten years in Ponce, in 1900 it moved to Caguas. In 1904, it moved again, to San Juan. Originally not a daily, it became a daily when Muñoz Rivera imported a Marinori press from the United States.  The Marinori press could produce 25,000 copies of a newspaper in one hour.

Coverage
The publication was mostly directed towards politics, but it also included poetry and stories published by Puerto Rican artists. The newspaper brought immediate controversy, which eventually led to Muñoz Rivera's arrest. Protests were organized throughout Puerto Rico and he was released after his father paid 15,000 pesetas as bond. Muñoz Rivera sold his half of the store, in order to raise funds for the publication's establishment.

Among the better known writers and contributors in La Democracia were Carlos del Toro Fernández, Gumersindo Rivas, Mariano Abril, Luis Rodríguez Cabrero, and José A. Negrón Sanjurjo, Rafael Matos Bernier, Antonio R. Barceló, José Coll y Vidal, Alfredo Vargas, José Dávila Ricci, Luis Muñoz Marín, Sebastián Dalmau Canet, Samuel R. Quiñones.

Legacy
La Democracia "laid the groundwork for Ponce's journalistic tradition." The building structure where La Democracia was edited and printed still stands in Ponce, on Calle Cristina across from Hotel Melia; a plaque on the side of the building states "site of Imprenta 'El Vapor' of Luis Muñoz Rivera".

Other Ponce-based papers
 El Ponceño (1852)
 El Fénix (1855) 
 El Derecho (1873) By Roman Baldorioty de Castro.
 La Crónica (1894) By Ramón Marín.
 El Postillón (1894) By Francisco Gonzalo Marín.
  El Día (1909)
 La Revista de Puerto Rico (ca. 1916)
 La Perla del Sur (1982) By Juan J. Nogueras.

See also

 List of newspapers in Puerto Rico

References

Further reading
Negron Portillo, Mariano. A Study of the Newspaper "La Democracia", Puerto Rico, 1895-1914: A Historical Analysis. Ph. D. Dissertation. State University of New York, 1989. 278p.

External links
 Image of the 10 January 1893 (Year 3, Issue 393) issue of "La Democracia". Accessed 21 August 2019.
 Image of the 25 March 1854 (Year 3, Issue 91) issue of "El Ponceño". Accessed 18 August 2019.
 Image of the 2 August 1856 (Year 2, Issue 57) issue of "El Fenix". Accessed 18 August 2019. Archived 16 June 2019. 
 Image of the 8 October 1884 (Year 1, Issue 1) issue of "El Avisador Ponceño". Accessed 18 August 2019.

Spanish-language newspapers published in Puerto Rico
Defunct newspapers published in Puerto Rico
Newspapers from Ponce, Puerto Rico
Newspapers established in 1890
1890 establishments in Puerto Rico